Jean Fontenoy (21 March 1899 – April 1945) was a French journalist and fascist politician who was a collaborator with Nazi Germany.

Biography 
Born in Fontainebleau, Seine-et-Marne, Fontenoy worked as a journalist for the Havas news agency from 1924 to the mid-1930s in Russia then China. In China, he founded the French-language Journal de Shanghai and became the subject of a gossip campaign suggesting that he was having an affair with Soong Mei-ling, Chiang Kai-shek's wife.

Returning to France he sought involvement in politics, initially with the French Communist Party before switching to the French Popular Party, a group that he left in 1939 because of his personal dislike of its leader, Jacques Doriot. Before long however Fontenoy put his personal issues to one side and rejoined the PPF and played a leading role in helping to reorganise the movement, whilst also writing widely, not only for the PPF journals but also for the likes of L'Insurgé and Je suis partout.

Despite his skill as an organiser and writer Fontenoy began to develop a reputation for eccentricity that was aided by his personal habits. Already an alcoholic, Fontenoy was widowed in 1941 and following the death of his wife he began to abuse opium and morphine. He was also seriously injured after volunteering for service in the Winter War and the head wounds that he sustained led to brain damage. Following these instances Fontenoy continued to be a leading figure on the far-right but his actions came to be somewhat more erratic. In 1938 he married Madeleine Charnaux.

For a time, he served Pierre Laval as his personal envoy to Otto Abetz. This was followed by the launch of the journal La Vie Nationale which proved short-lived and was followed by a number of equally-short-lived collaborationist reviews. He was a founder of Mouvement Social Révolutionnaire and became leader of the group in 1942 after Eugène Deloncle stepped aside. However, Fonteony soon lost interest in what was a declining group. He then switched over to the National Popular Rally and formed part of the five man directorate, chaired by Marcel Déat, that led the group.

During that period, Fontenoy became fixated with the notion that Doriot was plotting to kill him, despite a lack of evidence. This played a role in his next move when he enrolled in the Legion of French Volunteers Against Bolshevism (LVF) and was sent to the Eastern Front. He served as LVF propaganda chief was also acting as a spy. He was killed fighting the Soviets in Berlin a few days before the end of the war after he had been fatally shot in the head.

Bibliography 
 Gérard GUEGAN, Fontenoy ne reviendra plus, Stock, Parijs, 2011
 Philippe VILGIER, Jean Fontenoy, aventurier, journaliste et écrivain, Uitg. Via Romana, 2012

References 

1899 births
1945 deaths
People from Fontainebleau
French fascists
20th-century French newspaper publishers (people)
Volunteers in the Winter War
French Popular Party politicians
French Communist Party politicians
French male non-fiction writers
Former Marxists
20th-century French journalists
Legion of French Volunteers Against Bolshevism personnel
German military personnel killed in World War II
French expatriates in Finland